The Uruguayan Olympic Committee (COU) was founded in 1923 and was recognized by the IOC (International Olympic Committee) that same year.

It is the national governing body in charge of the Olympics. It is also a member of PASO, ACNO and ODESUR.

President is Julio César Maglione, since 1987, who has recently been reelected.

See also
Uruguay at the Olympics

External links
 Official website

Uruguay
Sports governing bodies in Uruguay
Uruguay at the Olympics
Sports organizations of Uruguay
Sports organizations established in 1923
1923 establishments in Uruguay